Dehnow-e Markazi (also Romanized as Dehnow-e Markazī) is a village in Rostam-e Do Rural District, in the Central District of Rostam County, Fars Province, Iran. At the 2006 census, its population was 868, in 184 families.

References 

Populated places in Rostam County